Hopkin is an English language patronymic surname meaning "son of Hob", derived from the masculine given name Hob meaning "famous". There are variants
including Hopkins. Hopkin is uncommon as a given name.  People with the name Hopkin include:

 David Hopkin (born 1970), Scottish footballer
 Deian Hopkin (born 1944), Welsh historian and Vice-Chancellor
 Fred Hopkin (1895–1970), English footballer
 Mary Hopkin (born 1950), Welsh singer

Given name
 Rhys Hopkin Morris (1888–1956), Welsh politician

References

Surnames
English-language surnames
Patronymic surnames
Surnames from given names